Capperia fusca is a moth of the family Pterophoridae. It is found in Spain, France, Belgium, Germany, Switzerland, Italy, Austria, Croatia, the Czech Republic, Poland, Slovakia, Hungary, Romania, Bulgaria, North Macedonia, Greece and southern Russia. It is also known from Turkey.

It is a montane species.

The larvae feed on Stachys alpina and Stachys cassia.

References

Oxyptilini
Moths described in 1898
Moths of Asia
Plume moths of Europe
Taxa named by Ottmar Hofmann